Susan Hirschman was the founder of children's publisher Greenwillow Books.

Career 

Hirschman was born in the Manhattan, and lived there for her entire career. She was inspired to enter the field of publishing during high school when she heard a talk by Jennie Lindquist. Her first job was in 1954, working as a secretary at publisher Alfred A. Knopf. She later moved to Sandpiper Press, and from there to Harper & Row, where she worked under Ursula Nordstrom. After taking time off from Harper & Row, she was quickly hired by Macmillan to head their children's book publishing division. She remained there until October 1974, when she resigned in protest of a mass firing. She founded Greenwillow as an imprint of William Morrow (now HarperCollins), where she remained until her retirement in 2001.

Works published 

During Hirschman's career, she was responsible for the US publication of Watership Down, as well as works by children's authors Kevin Henkes and Jack Prelutsky.

References 

People from Manhattan
American book editors
Children's book publishers